Keith Sillett (born 8 February 1929) is an Australian former cricketer. He played three first-class matches for Bengal in 1958/59.

See also
 List of Bengal cricketers

References

External links
 

1929 births
Living people
Australian cricketers
Bengal cricketers
Cricketers from Brisbane